Los Veteranos I is a census-designated place (CDP) in Webb County, Texas, United States. This was a new CDP formed from parts of the Ranchitos Las Lomas CDP prior to the 2010 census. The population was 0 at the 2020 census. 

It is one of several colonias in the county.

Geography
Los Veteranos I is located at  (27.633353, -99.218551).

Education
Residents are in the United Independent School District. Zoned schools include: Dr. Henry Cuellar Elementary School, Antonio Gonzalez Middle School, United South High School.

The designated community college for Webb County is Laredo Community College.

References

Census-designated places in Webb County, Texas
Census-designated places in Texas